Iceland competed at the 1980 Summer Olympics in Moscow, USSR.

Results by event

Athletics

Men
Track & road events

Field events

Judo

Men

Weightlifting

Men

References
Official Olympic Reports

Nations at the 1980 Summer Olympics
1980
Summer Olympics